Medway Ports, incorporating the Port of Sheerness and Chatham Docks is part of Peel Ports, the second largest port group in the United Kingdom.

Regeneration
Part of the Chatham Docks site is being regenerated as "Chatham Waters", a mixed-use development scheme promoted by Peel.

References

Ports and harbours of Kent
Peel Ports
Competent harbour authorities